Ian Donnelly (born 28 January 1981) is an Australian former professional rugby league footballer who played as a  in the 2000s. He played in the National Rugby League for the Cronulla-Sutherland Sharks, Gold Coast Titans, Melbourne Storm, Manly-Warringah Sea Eagles and the St George Illawarra Dragons.

Early life
Born in Newcastle, New South Wales. Donnelly was educated at St John's College, Woodlawn.

Ian played his junior rugby league for Marist Brothers Rams, Lismore.

Playing career
Donnelly played for St George Illawarra Dragons, Manly Sea Eagles and Gold Coast Titans.

He made his Melbourne Storm debut in round 3 of the 2005  NRL season against the Sea Eagles. Donnelly played over 30 first grade games for Melbourne Storm, before moving to the Titans.

References

External links
Gold Coast Titans profile
NRL profile

1981 births
Living people
Australian rugby league players
Cronulla-Sutherland Sharks players
Gold Coast Titans players
Manly Warringah Sea Eagles players
Melbourne Storm players
Rugby league players from Newcastle, New South Wales
Rugby league props
St. George Illawarra Dragons players